Andover Township is one of twenty-four townships in Henry County, Illinois, USA.  As of the 2010 census, its population was 954 and it contained 395 housing units.

Geography

Cities, towns, villages
 Andover

Adjacent townships
 Osco Township (north)
 Munson Township (northeast)
 Cambridge Township (east)
 Weller Township (southeast)
 Clover Township (south)
 Lynn Township (west)
 Western Township (northwest)

Cemeteries
The township contains these three cemeteries: Andover Township, Presbyterian and Rose Dale.

Major highways
  Illinois Route 81

Airports and landing strips
 Boyd Wheatleys Farm Airport
 Wheatley Landing Strip

Demographics

School districts
 Alwood Community Unit School District 225
 Cambridge Community Unit School District 227
 Orion Community Unit School District 223

Political districts
 Illinois's 17th congressional district
 State House District 71
 State Senate District 36

References
 
 United States Census Bureau 2008 TIGER/Line Shapefiles
 United States National Atlas

External links
 City-Data.com
 Illinois State Archives
 Township Officials of Illinois

Townships in Henry County, Illinois
Townships in Illinois